Adrián Misael Muro Hernández (born September 7, 1995, in Aguascalientes City, Aguascalientes), known as Adrián Muro, is a Mexican professional footballer who plays for Escorpiones F.C.

External links
 

Living people
1995 births
Mexican footballers
People from Aguascalientes City
Footballers from Aguascalientes
Sporting Canamy footballers
Alebrijes de Oaxaca players
La Piedad footballers
Deportivo CAFESSA Jalisco footballers
Ascenso MX players
Liga Premier de México players
Tercera División de México players
Association football forwards